Kevin Jared Hosein (born 1986) is a Caribbean novelist and short-story writer from Trinidad and Tobago. Publications and outlets where his writings have appeared include Lightspeed magazine, Wasafiri and BBC Radio 4. He is best-known for winning the 2018 Commonwealth Short Story Prize, the most global literary prize in the world, with his story "Passage".  He also won the regional (Caribbean) section of the Prize in 2015, with "The King of Settlement 4". His first adult novel, Hungry Ghosts, was announced for publication as a lead title in 2023 by Bloomsbury Publishing in the UK and Ecco Press in the US.

Background and education 
Kevin Jared Hosein was born in Chaguanas, Trinidad, in 1986.
As a young child, he was not initially interested in reading, but was more into video games, especially those with story-heavy plots. Later on in his childhood, Hosein became deeply interested in books and writing, particularly authors such as Stephen King and Cormac McMarthy. Of Caribbean literature, the 1972 novel No Pain Like This Body, written by Harold “Sonny” Ladoo, had a large influence on Hosein's interest in reading and writing.

Due to Literature not being offered as an option at his secondary school, Hosein obtained a degree in Biology and Environmental Studies at the University of West Indies.

Works, awards, and honours 
In 2015, Hosein's entry to the Commonwealth Short Story Prize, "The King of Settlement 4", won the Caribbean regional category of the prize. Then in 2018, he won the Commonwealth Short Story Prize, with his work "Passage". His entry won out of 5,200 entries from 48 countries, and he received £5,000 as an award on 2 July 2018, in Cyprus. The team who nominated Hosein was composed of Damon Galgut, Sunila Galappatti, Kateri Akiwenzie-Damm, Mark McWatt, Paula Morris, and Sarah Hall, who was the chair. 

"Passage", his story that won him the prize in 2018, is written in Trinidadian Creole, and is about a forester's quest to find a family living away from society, in the mountains of Trinidad, all while going through a midlife crisis. Among many of the themes it discusses, nature and the exploitation of such by humans are recurring. The story contains many ecological details that are thanks to his biology and environmental science degree, and the time he has spent on trails in the forest. 

The first story he entered for the Commonwealth Short Story Prize in 2013, "The Monkey Trap", was featured in Pepperpot: Best New Stories from the Caribbean. It has also been shortlisted for the Small Axe Literary Prize. He wrote a poem titled "The Wait is So, So Long", which was turned into a short film that received a Gold Key at the New York-based Scholastic Art & Writing Awards.

He has also the author of three works of fiction for young adults: Littletown Secrets, The Beast of Kukuyo and The Repenters. Littletown Secrets, his first book to be published, which he both wrote and illustrated in 2013, was awarded the title of Best Children's Book of 2013, by the Trinidad Guardian. It was followed by The Repenters (2016), which was shortlisted for the Bocas Prize and longlisted for the International Dublin Literary Award and the OCM Bocas Prize. His 2018 book, The Beast of Kukuyo, won second place for the Burt Award for Caribbean literature.

Hosein's first novel for adults is 2023's Hungry Ghosts, which won pre-publication praise from Hilary Mantel ("a deeply impressive book… and an important one") and Bernardine Evaristo ("An astonishing novel – linguistically gorgeous, narratively propulsive and psychologically profound"), among others. Reviewing it for The Times, Claire Allfree called Hungry Ghosts a "sumptuous, brilliantly written novel".

Bibliography 
 Littletown Secrets, 2013.
 The Repenters, Peepal Tree Press, 2016, .
 The Beast of Kukuyo, Central Books, 2018 .
 Hungry Ghosts, Bloomsbury Publishing, 2023, .

References

External links 
 Alice O'Keeffe, "Kevin Jared Hosein in conversation about the inspiration behind his novel Hungry Ghosts", The Bookseller, 11 November 2022.

1986 births
Living people
21st-century male writers
21st-century short story writers
People from Chaguanas
Trinidad and Tobago male writers
Trinidad and Tobago novelists
Trinidad and Tobago writers
University of the West Indies alumni